Solos is an Austronesian language of Buka Island, Papua New Guinea.

References

Northwest Solomonic languages
Languages of Papua New Guinea
Languages of the Autonomous Region of Bougainville